Elections to the Madhya Pradesh Legislative Assembly were held on 25 February 1957. 1,108 candidates contested for the 218 constituencies in the Assembly. There were 69 two-member constituencies and 149 single-member constituencies.

State Reorganization
On 1 November 1956, under States Reorganisation Act, 1956, Madhya Bharat (except the Sunel enclave of the Mandsaur district), Vindhya Pradesh, Bhopal State and the Sironj sub-division of the Kota district of Rajasthan were merged into Madhya Pradesh while the Marathi-speaking districts of Nagpur Division, (namely Buldana, Akola, Amravati, Yeotmal, Wardha, Nagpur, Bhandara and Chanda), were transferred to Bombay State. This resulted in increase in assembly constituencies from 184 with 232 seats to 218 constituencies with 288 seats during 1957 elections.

Results

!colspan=10|
|- style="background-color:#E9E9E9; text-align:center;"
! class="unsortable" |
! Political party !! Flag !! Seats  Contested !! Won !! Net change  in seats !! % of  Seats
! Votes !! Vote % !! Change in vote %
|- style="background: #90EE90;"
| 
| style="text-align:left;" |Indian National Congress
| 
| 288 || 232 ||  38 || 40.74 || 36,91,999 || 49.83 ||  0.76
|-
| 
| style="text-align:left;" |Praja Socialist Party
|
| 163 || 12 || New || 9.09 || 9,76,021 || 13.17 || New
|-
| 
| style="text-align:left;" |Bharatiya Jana Sangh
|
| 133 || 10 ||  10 || 1.01 || 7,33,315 || 9.90 ||  6.32
|-
| 
| style="text-align:left;" |Akhil Bharatiya Ram Rajya Parishad
|
| 53 || 5 ||  2 || 1.29 || 2,29,010 || 3.09 ||  0.58
|-
| 
| style="text-align:left;" |Akhil Bharatiya Hindu Mahasabha
|
| 48 || 7 ||  7 || 0.25 || 3,45,122 || 4.66 ||  4.56
|-
| 
| style="text-align:left;" |Communist Party of India
| 
| 25 || 2 ||  2 || 3.28 || 1,20,549 || 1.63 ||  4.66
|-
| 
|
| 372 || 20 ||  3 || 34.26 || 12,22,003 || 16.49 || N/A
|- class="unsortable" style="background-color:#E9E9E9"
! colspan = 3|
! style="text-align:center;" |Total Seats !! 288 ( 56) !! style="text-align:center;" |Voters !! 1,99,31,685 !! style="text-align:center;" |Turnout !! colspan = 2|74,08,768 (37.17%)
|}

Elected members

See also

 1957 elections in India
 1952 Madhya Pradesh Legislative Assembly election
 1952 Madhya Bharat Legislative Assembly election
 1952 Bhopal Legislative Assembly election
 1952 Vindhya Pradesh Legislative Assembly election

References

1957
1957
Madhya Pradesh